How I Knew Her is the first solo studio album by American musician Nataly Dawn of the duo Pomplamoose, released on February 12, 2013 under Nonesuch Records. The album was funded by a Kickstarter campaign which raised over $100,000 and was produced by Pomplamoose half Jack Conte.

Reception
How I Knew Her was met with "generally favorable reviews" from critics. At Metacritic, which assigns a weighted average rating out of 100 to reviews from mainstream publications, this release received an average score of 68, based on 12 reviews.

Track listing

References

2013 albums
Kickstarter-funded albums